25 Churchill Place is a  tall skyscraper in the eastern part of the London financial district Canary Wharf. It was built in 2014 and has 23 storeys. The building was developed by Canary Wharf Group and designed by Kohn Pedersen Fox.

History

Planning
Canary Wharf Group applied to Tower Hamlets for planning permission to construct a 23-storey building at 25 Churchill Place, E14 in April 2008. Permission was granted in November 2008.

25 Churchill Place was planned to be an energy-efficient and sustainable office building. The Environmental features would include lifts that could store and reuse the energy elsewhere in the building. It also planned to has 19 storeys of grade A office space. The building was designed by architects Kohn Pedersen Fox who also designed The Pinnacle (London) in the City of London Financial District and will be developed by Canary Wharf Group.

Construction

Construction began on the 23-storey tower in February 2012 with Canary Wharf Contractors Limited as the main building contractor. On 7 February 2013, the installation of the final section of the steel frame marks the completion of the building and had reached a major milestone.

Tenants
25 Churchill Place has been used by some notable companies and organizations as their headquarter. It houses Ernst & Young since 2015, who have taken floors 11–21. The European Medicines Agency (EMA) took floors 1–10 in 2014, however due to Brexit the EMA has now relocated to Amsterdam, Netherlands, with US company Wework subletting the space as well as floors 11 and 13.

See also
One Churchill Place
City of London#Landmarks
Canary Wharf
One Canada Square
List of tallest buildings and structures in London

References

External links
 Canary Wharf official website regarding the project

Canary Wharf buildings
Office buildings completed in 2014
2014 in London
Skyscraper office buildings in London